Current Time TV is a Russian-language television channel with editorial office in Prague, created by the US organisations Radio Free Europe/Radio Liberty and Voice of America. The channel – via RFE/RL – is funded through grants from the US Congress through the US Agency for Global Media. Representatives of the US government, including the head of the Governing Council on Broadcasting, are prohibited from interfering in the work of the channel's journalists. The media sees its task in "promoting democratic values and institutions". RFE/RL launched Current Time, in October 2014. The official round-the-clock broadcasting began on February 7, 2017.

Current Time was instituted as an alternative to Kremlin-controlled media and Russian propaganda. Despite the fact that Current Time was intended to counterbalance Russian official news coverage, Kenan Aliyev, executive editor of Current Time, told Reuters that C.T. was not counterpropaganda at all.

Current Time is available on cable, satellite and digital platforms in Russia, the Baltics, Belarus, Ukraine, the Caucasus and central Asia. It had over 1,500,000 followers on Facebook and  1,300,000 subscribers on YouTube in August 2020.

On 27 February 2022, Roskomnadzor blocked the website of the channel for its coverage of the Russian invasion of Ukraine.

References

External links

Russian-language television stations
Television networks in Russia
Internet television channels
Public broadcasting in the United States
Democracy promotion
International broadcasters
Free Media Awards winners
Radio Free Europe/Radio Liberty
Media listed in Russia as foreign agents
Russian-language websites